The IBM 603 Electronic Multiplier was the first mass-produced commercial electronic calculating device; it used full-size vacuum tubes to perform multiplication and addition.  (The earlier IBM 600 and released in the same year IBM 602 used relay logic.) The IBM 603 was adapted as the arithmetic unit in the IBM Selective Sequence Electronic Calculator. It was designed by James W. Bryce, and included circuits patented by A. Halsey Dickenson in 1937.
The IBM 603 was developed in Endicott, New York, and announced on September 27, 1946.

Only about 20 were built since the bulky tubes made it hard to manufacture, but the demand showed that the product was filling a need. The commercial interest in the 603 came as a surprise to IBM and Thomas Watson Sr, head of IBM, felt that the device had limitations so  Ralph Palmer and Jerrier Haddad were hired to develop a more refined and versatile device, the IBM 604 Electronic Calculating Punch. 

The IBM 603 was the predecessor of the IBM 604, a programmable device with more complex capabilities. The 604 used miniature tubes and a patented design for pluggable modules, which made the product easier to manufacture and service. Throughout the following 10 years IBM would build and lease 5600 of the IBM 604.

References

External links 
 Columbia University Computing History: The IBM 603
 IBM Archives: IBM 603 electronic multiplier
  US patent 2641408, filed October 26, 1951, issued June 9, 1953, Russel A. Rowley and Delmar C. Newcomb

603
Programmable calculators